Joseph T. Coleman (November 5, 1912 – September 5, 1979) was an American football player and coach. 

He played college football, basketball, and baseball at Texas Christian University (TCU) and was captain and quarterback of the 1934 team. 

He was a high school coach in Odessa, Texas, from 1938 to 1941 and 1946 to 1950, where he coached future Iowa Hawkeyes football coaching legend Hayden Fry. His 1946 team was undefeated and won the Texas state championship and compiled a 77–18–3 record at Odessa. He served in the United States Navy during World War II.

In April 1951, he was hired as the head football coach at New Mexico A&M. He compiled a 3–15–1 record in two seasons at New Mexico A&M. After leaving New Mexico A&M, 

Coleman returned to Odessa where he was a partner in an athletic supply company. He was inducted into the Texas High School Coaches Association's Hall of Honor in 1971. He died in 1979 in Odessa of an apparent heart attack.

Head coaching record

College

References

1912 births
1979 deaths
American football quarterbacks
TCU Horned Frogs football coaches
New Mexico State Aggies football coaches
High school football coaches in Texas
United States Navy personnel of World War II
People from Odessa, Texas